Leiuranus is a genus of eels in the snake eel family Ophichthidae. It currently contains the following species:

 Leiuranus semicinctus (Lay & E. T. Bennett, 1839) (Saddled snake-eel)
 Leiuranus versicolor (J. Richardson, 1848) (Convict snake-eel)

References

 

Ophichthidae